Marie-Thérèse Letablier (born 4 January 1947), is a French sociologist. Her major sociological works concern work, family and gender issues. She is Research director in the French National Center for Scientific Research (CNRS) and a senior research fellow in the Paris Centre d’Economie de la Sorbonne (CES).

Marie Thérèse Letablier is a member of the Executing Committee of the European Sociological Association (or ESA), an association aimed to facilitate sociological research, teaching and communication on European issues, and to build networks between European sociologists.

As a woman who has grown up during the seventies, she has developed research interests concerning family and gender issues. They have been mainly studied in a European comparative perspective. She has participated in several European research networks: on Families and Family Policies (for Sweden and France), on Gender and Employment (for Germany and France), on Social practices and Social Policies with regard to working and mothering, and on Childcare services.

Selected bibliography

Books

Chapters in books

Journal articles 
 
 
 
  Pdf.

References

External links
Page in the French Wikipedia

1947 births
20th-century social scientists
20th-century French scientists
20th-century French women scientists
21st-century social scientists
21st-century French scientists
21st-century French women scientists
French National Centre for Scientific Research scientists
French sociologists
Living people
University of Paris people
French women sociologists